Salvia atrocyanea is a herbaceous perennial plant that is native to Bolivia. It has large green calyces and blue-tinged bracts.

Notes

atrocyanea
Flora of Bolivia